Johannes Matthias Sperger, also often Johann, (Czech: Jan Matyáš Sperger; 23 March 1750 – 13 May 1812) was an Austrian double bassist and composer.

Sperger was born in Feldsberg,  and trained from 1767 in Vienna as a contrabassist and composer. He worked from 1777 in the Hofkapelle of the Archbishop of Pressburg. From 1778 he was also a member in the Wiener Tonkünstlersozietät, in whose concerts he appeared several times with his own works and as soloist. From 1783 to 1786, Sperger was a member of the Hofkapelle of count Ludwig von Erdödy in Kohfidisch. From 1789 he was employed as first contrabassist of the Mecklenburg Schwerin Hofkapelle in Ludwigslust. He was an extremely productive composer who wrote at least forty-four symphonies, numerous instrumental concertos, among them are eighteen contrabass concertos. Furthermore, he also wrote sonatas, rondos and dances, cantatas, choral works, and airs.  He died in Ludwigslust, aged 62.

Notes

External links 
 
 

1750 births
1812 deaths
18th-century classical composers
18th-century Austrian male musicians
18th-century Austrian people
19th-century male musicians
Austrian male classical composers
Austrian expatriates in Germany
Austrian Classical-period composers
People from Valtice
Pupils of Johann Georg Albrechtsberger